Aleksandar Kostić (born 12 October 1995) is an Austrian professional footballer who plays as a midfielder for Admira Wacker.

Career

Early career
Kostic debuted as senior in 2012 playing with Wiener Sport-Club in the Regionalliga where he stayed until 2015 when he moved to same level side First Vienna FC where he played two seasons.

Rapid Wien
Over a 100 appearances in Regionalliga in 5 seasons called the attention of Austrian giants SK Rapid Wien which brought him back in summer 2017. Rapid was a club where he spent much of his youth career, between 2001 and 2010. Rapid´s academy product, Kostic was this time joining the main team and made hid debut with one appearances in the 2017–18 Austrian Football Bundesliga, plus 5 in the first half of the 2018–19 Austrian Football Bundesliga. Simultaneously, he also played with the second team in the Regionalliga where he was much more active making 26 appearances and scoring 8 goals in that same period.

Radnički Niš
Despite receiving much more playing time in his second year in Rapid, both in main and second team, during winter-break of 2018–19 season Kostic moved abroad to his ancestors' country, Serbia, and signed with top-level side FK Radnički Niš. However, his move didn't go as expected, the club's coach gave preference to other options, and, after ending the season without even debuting in the Serbian SuperLiga, he departed and returned to Austria.

Blau-Weiß Linz
On 14 June 2019 FC Blau-Weiß Linz confirmed, that Kostić had joined the club on a one-year deal.

Admira Wacker
Kostić joined recently relegated 2. Liga club Admira Wacker on 13 June 2022, signing a two-year contract. He made his competitive debut for the club on 17 July in an Austrian Cup match against SVg Purgstall.

References

External links
Aleksandar Kostić at ÖFB

Austrian footballers
Footballers from Vienna
Austrian people of Serbian descent
1995 births
Living people
SK Rapid Wien players
Wiener Sport-Club players
First Vienna FC players
FK Radnički Niš players
FC Blau-Weiß Linz players
FC Admira Wacker Mödling players
Austrian Football Bundesliga players
2. Liga (Austria) players
Austrian Regionalliga players
Association football midfielders